Dionisio Foianini Banzer (28 February 1903 – 23 November 2001) was a Bolivian politician and businessman from Santa Cruz de la Sierra. He was one of the founders of YPFB in 1937.

The son of an Italian father, Dionisio Foianini Ioli, and a Bolivian mother, Carmen Banzer Aliaga, he grew up in central Bolivia not far from most of Standard Oil's Bolivian fields. After studying pharmacy in Italy, where he came to admire Benito Mussolini's fascism, Foianini returned to Bolivia before the Chaco War broke out and was put in charge of munitions manufacture. During the war, he went on a secret mission to Argentina and organized Bolivian espionage behind Paraguayan lines. When the war ended, Foianini organized the nationalization of the Standard Oil fields and set up a State Petroleum Board. After Germán Busch organized a coup in 1937, Foianini became Minister of Mines and Petroleum in Busch's Cabinet.

The area called Dionisio Foianini Triangle on the border with Paraguay and Brazil is named after him.
Puerto Busch, which is named after Germán Busch, is located in the triangle.

References 

1903 births
2001 deaths
People from Santa Cruz de la Sierra
Bolivian people of Italian descent
Mining ministers of Bolivia